The 1999 Faber Grand Prix doubles was the doubles event of the seventh edition of the Faber Grand Prix; a WTA Tier II tournament held in Hannover, Germany. Lisa Raymond and Rennae Stubbs were the defending champions but did not compete that year.

Serena Williams and Venus Williams won in the final 5–7, 6–2, 6–2 against Alexandra Fusai and Nathalie Tauziat.

Seeds

Draw

External links
 1999 Faber Grand Prix Doubles Draw

Faber Grand Prix
Faber Grand Prix